Tangibility is the property of being able to be perceived by touch. A commonplace understanding of "tangibility" renders it as an attribute allowing something to be perceptible to the senses.

In criminal law, one of the elements of an offense of larceny is that the stolen property must be tangible.

In the context of intellectual property, expression in tangible form is one of the requirements for copyright protection.

In the context of international tax law, article 5(1) of the OECD Model Tax Treaty requires to date a permanent establishment to consist of a tangible place of business. This is problematic concerning the taxation of the Digital Economy.

In the context of trade, "tangibles" are physical goods (as opposed to "intangible" services and software).

See also
 Tangible property
 Tangible media
 Tangible user interface
 Tangible investment
 Tangible common equity

References

Legal terminology